The New Zealand Co-operative Party or the United Liberal Co-operative Party was a short-lived political party in New Zealand. It was founded in December 1941 by anti-socialist political organiser Albert Davy after he left the People's Movement. 

Davy had previously managed a number of successful political campaigns for other parties, but had frequently fallen out with his colleagues over ideological differences. The Co-operative Party was strongly rooted in Davy's strong hostility to the left-wing Labour Party, which was in government at the time.

The Co-operative Party never stood for election or won seats in Parliament.

References

Political parties established in 1941
Defunct political parties in New Zealand
1941 establishments in New Zealand